The men's 65 kg competition in judo at the 1992 Summer Olympics in Barcelona was held on 1 August at the Palau Blaugrana. The gold medal was won by Rogério Sampaio of Brazil.

Results

Main brackets

Pool A

Pool B

Repechages

Repechage A

Repechage B

Final

Final classification

References

External links
 

M65
Judo at the Summer Olympics Men's Half Lightweight
Men's events at the 1992 Summer Olympics